"No Estoy Sola" is a song recorded by Argentine singer Lali. The track appears on A Bailar (2014), her debut studio album. The song was written by Lali, Peter Akselrad, Luis Burgio, Gustavo Novello, and produced by 3musica. The song was released on March 25, 2015, along with the digital release of A Bailar.

Live performances
On August 8, 2014, Lali performed "No Estoy Sola" at the charity TV special Un sol para los chicos, where she also performed "Histeria and "A Bailar". The song was included on the set list of her A Bailar Tour.

Music video
A music video was shot in order to support the performances of the song during the A Bailar Tour. The video shows Lali's family, as well as a lot of fans and her boyfriend at that moment, Benjamín Amadeo. It was directed by Juan Ripari, from the production company Cinemática Films. The music video was included on the deluxe edition of A Bailar, which was released in December, 2014.

References

2014 songs
Lali Espósito songs
Songs written by Gustavo Novello
Songs written by Pablo Akselrad
Songs written by Lali Espósito